Bendje is a department of Ogooué-Maritime Province in western Gabon. The capital lies at Port-Gentil. It had a population of 140,747 in 2013.

Towns and villages

References

Departments of Gabon
Ogooué-Maritime Province